Leitão, sometimes Anglicized Leitao (literally meaning suckling pig), is a traditional Portuguese (and Pan-Iberian) dish made of a suckling pig, known more commonly under its Spanish name Lechón.

As surname
It is also a popular Portuguese surname. Notable people with the surname include:

 Alexandre Filipe Clemente Leitão (born 1979), Portuguese footballer
 João Baptista da Silva Leitão de Almeida Garrett (1799-1854), Portuguese poet, playwright, novelist and politician
 António Leitão (1960–2012), Portuguese athlete
 Ashley Leitão (born 1986), Canadian singer
 Carlos Leitão, (born 1959), former finance minister, Canadian province of Quebec
 Dave Leitao (born 1960), American basketball coach
 Joaquim Leitão (born 1956), Portuguese film director
 Jorge Leitão (born 1974), Portuguese football player
 José Leitão de Barros (1896–1967), Portuguese film director and playwright
 Rafael Leitão (born 1979), Brazilian chess grandmaster
 Maria Luisa Leitao, Hong Kong television host and actress

See also
 Cândido Firmino de Mello-Leitão (1886–1948), Brazilian zoologist
 George N. Leighton (1912–2018), United States District Court judge; his original surname was Leitão

Portuguese-language surnames